East Beckley was an unincorporated community located in Raleigh County, West Virginia. Its post office  was reopened in February 2014.  East Beckley comprised parts of the unincorporated communities of Sylvia and Atkinsville.

References 

 

Unincorporated communities in West Virginia
Unincorporated communities in Raleigh County, West Virginia